Khurshid Ahmed or Ahmad may refer to:
Khursheed Ahmad (1956–2007) Pakistani Naat Khawan
Khurshid Hasan Khurshid (1924–1988), secretary of Muhammad Ali Jinnah, mistakenly called "Khurshid Ahmed" in some sources.
Khurshid Ahmad (Islamic scholar) (born 1932), Pakistani economist, writer, and Islamic activist
Khurshid Ahmed (cricketer) (born 1934), Pakistani cricketer
 Khurshid Ahmed (trade unionist), General Secretary of the Pakistan Workers' Federation